Robert Duff Mauchline is a Scottish former footballer who played as an outside left for Heart of Midlothian. He later played for English clubs Blackpool, Barrow and Accrington Stanley in the English Football League.

References

Footballers from Falkirk
Scottish footballers
Heart of Midlothian F.C. players
Blackpool F.C. players
Barrow A.F.C. players
Accrington Stanley F.C. (1891) players
English Football League players
Possibly living people
Association football outside forwards
Year of birth missing